Bernard Aimé Poulin is a visual artist specializing in portraits and the author of articles and books on drawing, creativity and societal implications in the realization of the "self".

Poulin, a native of Windsor, Ontario, was born on 4 January 1945. He is married to retired (2015) Canadian Senator Marie Charette-Poulin. They have two adult daughters, Elaine and Valérie.

Artistic work 
Poulin specializes in corporate and private portraiture as well as commissioned exhibitions. A Fellow of the Canadian Institute of Portrait Artists (CIPA) he was its President for the 2003–2005 term. Poulin has created portraits of politicians, royalty, corporate executives, artists, athletes and religious figures. His exhibitions include Tuscany and Venice (1996), Provence (1998), Jerusalem (2000), Paris (2005) and a Grand Tour Exhibition in 2007.

Poulin also sculpts in bronze, using the lost wax process. As a muralist, he has created several three-dimensional, mixed-media projects such as those in the lobby of the Children's Hospital of Eastern Ontario, the Ottawa Children's Aid Society and the Solange Karsh Center for Medical Research.

Publications 
Poulin has participated in the creation of more than 10 books dedicated to the process of drawing. His articles and television appearances have been translated into Portuguese and Italian.  He is the author of 11 of his own books.  His Complete Colored Pencil Book was published by FW Publications (North Light division) in 1992. It  has sold more than 75,000 copies. Its French translation, Le crayon de couleur, was published in Paris in 1995. The softcover re-issue of The Complete Colored Pencil Book appeared in 2002 and was again re-released in a revised version under the banner of North Light Classics in 2011.

In December 2010, Poulin's 40-year research project on creativity was published under the title Beyond Discouragement – Creativity. Written in the form of a classic essay, it discusses the effects of the past century on creativity.

In 2015, On Life, Death And Nude Painting was published under the Classic Perceptions banner. This book's theme is the encouragement of "thinking."

Legacy 
In 1990 the Hadassah WIZO of Canada created the Bernard Aimé Poulin Scholarships for students pursuing studies in the visual arts.

In 2011, Poulin was named "chevalier" (knight) of the Order of La Pléiade|Ordre de la Pléiade by the Assemblée parlementaire de la francophonie, in recognition of his contribution to the visual arts and the French language and culture.
 
In June 2019, Poulin is awarded an Honorary Doctorate by Laurentian University of Sudbury.

On 14 July 2019, The Masterworks Museum of Bermuda unveils 4 major Poulin artworks for their collection. The Museum also celebrates the 46 years Poulin has been painting Bermuda and its people. The honorary Patron of this event was Dame Jennifer Smith, past Premier of Bermuda.

On 25 September 2019 the biography of the artist: Bernard Aimé Poulin - a portrait, un portrait is launched at the Galerie Jean-Claude Bergeron in Ottawa. The heavily illustrated biography was written by the author Benoît Cazabon.

On 21 November 2019, Poulin is awarded the Order of Ottawa by the Mayor Jim Watson.

References

External links
 

1945 births
Living people
20th-century Canadian painters
Canadian male painters
21st-century Canadian painters
Artists from Windsor, Ontario
20th-century Canadian male artists
21st-century Canadian male artists